The  women's 100 metres hurdles at the 2009 World Championships in Athletics was held at the Olympic Stadium 18 and 19 August.

The world leader Lolo Jones had not qualified for the championships, but a number of athletes had also posted fast times and scored major victories on the World Athletics Tour that season. Among the possible medallists were Americans Damu Cherry, Ginnie Powell. reigning Olympic champion Dawn Harper, and two-time world champion Michelle Perry. Canadians Priscilla Lopes-Schliep and 2003 champion Perdita Felicien were contenders for the title, and the new Oceanian record holder Sally McLellan had shown consistent form. Rounding out the favourites of the field, Jamaican athletes Brigitte Foster-Hylton and Delloreen Ennis-London were seeking to build on past championship successes.

Michelle Perry's chance to gain a third gold ended in the heats, as she was hampered by an injury and finished seventh. Lopes-Schliep registered the fastest time of the first day, with 12.56 seconds. Harper was the fastest in the semi-finals with 12.48 seconds, a new personal best. Compatriot Cherry was the biggest name to be eliminated, unable to beat Irish athlete Derval O'Rourke to the fastest non-qualifying time.

In the final, Harper had a slow start and clipped the second hurdle, effectively ruling her out of the medals. Foster-Hylton, Lopes-Schliep, O'Rourke, McLellan and Ennis-London were all equal at the halfway mark. Foster-Hylton pulled away to take the gold, with Lopes-Schliep holding off Ennis London to win the silver medal. Just behind the medallists were two athletes with unexpected performances: the unfavoured O'Rourke finished fourth with an Irish record while McLellan, one of the pre-race favourites, posted a modest time for fifth place.

Foster-Hylton's gold medal was Jamaica's first in the event on the world stage, and also made her the oldest-ever winner of the sprint hurdles at the World Championships.

Medalists

Records

Qualification standards

Schedule

Results

Heats
Qualification: First 4 in each heat (Q) and the next 4 fastest (q) advance to the semifinals.

Key:  Q = qualification by place in heat, q = qualification by overall place, SB = Seasonal best

Semifinals
Qualification: First 2 in each semifinals (Q) and the next 2 fastest (q) advance to the final.

Key:  NR = National record, PB = Personal best, Q = qualification by place in heat, q = qualification by overall place, SB = Seasonal best

Final

Key:  NR = National record, SB = Seasonal best

References
General
100 metres hurdles results. IAAF. Retrieved on 2009-08-23.
Specific

100 metres hurdles
Sprint hurdles at the World Athletics Championships
2009 in women's athletics